Jose Antonio "Mark" Sermonia Leviste II (born December 25, 1977) is a Filipino politician. A member of PDP–Laban, he was elected as Vice Governor of Batangas in 2007 and was re-elected in 2010, 2013 and 2022. He was elected as a Member of the Batangas Provincial Board, representing the 4th District, in 2004. He studied at La Salle Green Hills and has a BSc from De La Salle-College of Saint Benilde.

In August 2020, Leviste tested positive for COVID-19. He was able to recover from the disease.

References 

21st-century Filipino politicians
Living people
Filipino Roman Catholics
De La Salle–College of Saint Benilde alumni
1977 births